Asher yatzar ( "Who has formed man") is a blessing in Judaism. It is recited after engaging in an act of excretion or urination, but is also included in many Jewish prayer books as a part of daily prayer prior to birkot hashachar.

The purpose of this blessing is to thank God for good health. It expresses thanks for having the ability to excrete, for without it existence would be impossible.
Though recited normally by observant Jews each time excretory functions are used, it is also recited during the Shacharit service due to its spiritual significance (to Jews, humans are made in God's image, so it is an expression of awe toward God's creations).

Sources 
The obligation to recite a blessing upon leaving the bathroom could be traced to the following passage in Berachot (60b):

Abaye objects to saying the above, and suggests one should recite something else prior to relieving oneself as well as recite a blessing similar to Asher Yatzar upon exiting the latrine.

A dispute over what the conclusion (chasima) of the blessing should be is recorded:

The Halakha follows Rav Papa.

Process
After completing urination or defecation and upon leaving the bathroom, the person washes their hands. According to Jewish etiquette, this should be done outside the bathroom, but if there is no source of water available outside the bathroom, it is permissible to wash one's hands inside the bathroom, then dry them outside; some are lenient in modern bathrooms to wash the bathroom as our bathrooms are much more clean than the outhouses of the olden days. No al netilat yadayim blessing is recited for the handwashing.

Following the washing and drying of one's hands, the asher yatzar blessing is recited.

 Text 
English [Presented in Nusach Sfarad; see footnotes for other Nuschaot]
, or  would be sealed, it would be impossible to survive  . Blessed are You, Adonai, Who heals all flesh and acts wondrously."

Hebrew [Presented in Nusach Sfarad; see footnotes for other Nuschaot]
"

People with medical issues
There is no consensus as to whether or not (or how often) a person with medical issues should recite Asher Yatzar'':
A person with incontinence should recite the blessing after urination, even if it is involuntary
One who has no bowel or bladder control does not recite the blessing at all
One who, as a result of medication feels an interrupted need to urinate, should recite the blessing a single time after they have emptied their bladder
One who has a urinary catheter is considered to engage in a single act of urination lasting the entire day, so the catheter's wearer should recite the blessing once in the morning with the intent that it apply to all urination for the entire day.
One who has diarrhea should recite the blessing after each instance of diarrhea
One who has taken a laxative should not recite the blessing until the laxative has taken effect
One whose mind is not completely settled due to illness is exempt

See also
List of Jewish prayers

References

External links

Asher Yatzar prayer in both Hebrew and English from the Open Source Sefaria project

Excretion
Jewish prayer and ritual texts
Jewish blessings
Hebrew words and phrases in Jewish prayers and blessings
Hebrew words and phrases in Jewish law